Neoneides is a genus of stilt bugs in the family Berytidae. There is one described species in Neoneides, N. muticus.

References

Further reading

 
 

Berytidae
Articles created by Qbugbot